Sagittaria natans is a species of flowering plant in the water plantain family. It is native to northern Europe and Asia and often cultivated elsewhere as an aquatic ornamental in aquaria and artificial ponds. It is widespread across much of the Russian Federation and reported also from Finland, Sweden, Mongolia, Japan, Korea, Kazakhstan and China (Heilongjiang, Jilin, Liaoning, Nei Mongol, Xinjiang).

Sagittaria natans is an aquatic plant, growing in slow-moving and stagnant water bodies such as ponds and small streams. It has floating leaves that are linear, heart-shaped or arrow-shaped.

References

natans
Flora of China
Flora of Heilongjiang
Flora of Jilin
Flora of Liaoning
Flora of Xinjiang
Flora of Inner Mongolia
Flora of Mongolia
Flora of Korea
Flora of Japan
Flora of Russia
Flora of Siberia
Flora of Sweden
Flora of Finland
Flora of Kazakhstan
Freshwater plants
Edible plants
Plants described in 1776